William Bryan (22 September 1856 – 22 May 1933) was an English first-class cricketer.

Byran was born at Kimberley, Nottinghamshire. He made a single appearance in first-class cricket for the South in the North v South fixture of 1886 at Lord's. Batting twice in the match, Bryran was dismissed for 7 runs in the South's first-innings by Frank Shacklock, while following-on in their second-innings he was dismissed for 4 runs by William Cropper. He later played minor counties cricket for Cambridgeshire, making 42 appearances in the Minor Counties Championship between 1897–1903.

He died at Cambridge in May 1933.

References

External links

1856 births
1933 deaths
People from Kimberley, Nottinghamshire
Cricketers from Nottinghamshire
English cricketers
North v South cricketers
Cambridgeshire cricketers